Fair Play is a rural unincorporated community in Millstone Township, Monmouth County, New Jersey, United States. It is just south of Disbrow Hill and north of Rocky Brook on County Route 1 (Perrineville Road) at Fairplay Road, west of Perrineville and southeast of Hightstown.

History
The school district in Fair Play had 48 children attending in 1892, and a school house existed in 1889. Since the 1980s, much of the area has been developed as single-family homes in subdivisions.

References

Millstone Township, New Jersey
Unincorporated communities in Monmouth County, New Jersey
Unincorporated communities in New Jersey